A list of British films released in 2004:

2004

See also
 2004 in film
 2004 in British music
 2004 in British radio
 2004 in British television
 2004 in the United Kingdom
 List of 2004 box office number-one films in the United Kingdom

External links

References 

2004
Films
British